Break a leg is a well-known idiom in theatre which means "good luck". It may also refer to:
Break a Leg (web series), an American comedy web series
"Break a Leg" (song)
Break a Leg (film), a 2005 film featuring Sandra Oh